The 2012 Race of Champions was the 25th running of the event, and took place over 14–16 December 2012 at the Rajamangala Stadium in Bangkok, Thailand. During the first day, a ROC Thailand contest was held with four local drivers to decide the identity of the Thai representatives. The top two drivers (Nattavude Charoensukawattana and Tin Sritrai) advanced to the ROC Asia contest, where they faced teams from India, China and Japan. The Thai team was guaranteed a place in the main Nations Cup, whilst the second spot was taken by the victorious Indian team formed by F1 driver Narain Karthikeyan and WEC driver Karun Chandhok. During the second day, Germany took their sixth consecutive Nations Cup victory courtesy of Sebastian Vettel and Michael Schumacher, beating France (Sébastien Ogier and Romain Grosjean) in the final 2–0. During the final day, Romain Grosjean won the Race of Champions, beating Tom Kristensen 2–0 in a closely fought final. In the UK, the live broadcasts of the latter two days of the event on Motors TV attracted a peak of 44,000 television viewers, a respectable figure for a satellite-only channel.

Participants

Champions from numerous series were invited, including Formula One (Sebastian Vettel, Michael Schumacher and Romain Grosjean), MotoGP (Jorge Lorenzo and Mick Doohan), WTCC (Andy Priaulx), V8 Supercars (Jamie Whincup), PWRC (Benito Guerra) and IndyCar (Ryan Hunter-Reay). Also present was eight-time 24 Hours of Le Mans winner Tom Kristensen. The 2012 edition marked the first time drivers from India, Thailand and Mexico have competed, whilst it was the first time since the inaugural Nations Cup event in 1999 that there were no Finnish drivers present. Reigning champion Sébastien Ogier was the only former 'Champion of Champions' in attendance.

ROC Asia

2012 marked the inaugural ROC Asia event, with drivers from a variety of championships (including Formula One, WEC and Super GT) taking part. The top two drivers from ROC Thailand would represent Thailand in the event.

ROC Thailand

The ROC Thailand contest was held to decide who would represent Thailand in ROC Asia, the Nations Cup and the Race of Champions. 2001 Asian Touring Car Series champion Charoensukawattana and 1999 Formula Asia champion Horthongkum battled out with drift driver Nana and touring car driver Sritrai to be among the top 2.

Cars
Seven cars were used throughout the event. The Toyota GT86 and Lamborghini Gallardo Super Trofeo made their debut in this year, while the Škoda Fabia was dropped.

 Audi R8 LMS
 KTM X-Bow
 Lamborghini Gallardo Super Trofeo
 Euro Racecar
 ROC Car
 Toyota GT86
 Volkswagen Scirocco

The track

A 697 metres tarmac track was constructed in the Rajamangala Stadium. The track had a bridge to connect the outer lane with the inner lane in an 8 shape track. All the races were run to 2 laps (1.394 km). In the first day a chicane was placed in the bridge area. The chicane was modified for the second and third day making the lap time longer.

Tom Kristensen made the fastest time (1:14.0680) on the second configuration in an Audi R8 at speed of 67.75 km/h.

ROC Thailand

Round Robin

Final

ROC Asia

Round Robin

Final

Nations Cup

Drivers who made a false start are marked with a Yellow card  in the tables, and a time penalty of 5 seconds was added to their original time.

Group A

Group B

Finals

Semifinals

Final

Race of Champions
Ho-Pin Tung and Kazuya Oshima qualified having achieved the best times (among non-Thai drivers) in ROC Asia.

Group A

Group B

Group C

Group D

Knockout stage

Quarterfinals

Semifinals

Final

References

External links
 Official site

Race of Champions
Race of Champions
Sport in Bangkok
Race of Champions
Auto races in Thailand
International sports competitions hosted by Thailand